Dogo or Doro (Dɔ́rɔ́) is a village and administrative centre (chef-lieu) of the commune of Bimbéré Tama in the Cercle of Youwarou in the Mopti Region of southern-central Mali.

Dogo village is situated on the lower slope of a mountain overlooking a narrow valley with borassus palms and Vitex. Farming, herding, and gardening (tobacco and other crops) are the main economic activities. Bangime, a language isolate, is spoken in Dogo. Local surnames are Katile, Bore, Bamani, and Guindo.

References

Populated places in Mopti Region